Werner Schreyer (14 November 1930 in Nuremberg; 12 February 2006 in Bochum) was a German mineralogist and experimental metamorphic petrologist. Schreyer completed his undergraduate work in geology and petrology at the University of Erlangen-Nuremberg, obtained his doctorate from the University of Munich in 1957, and in 1966 received his Habilitation from the University of Kiel. He was a professor at Ruhr University Bochum from 1966 to 1996. In 2002 Schreyer became the first German to be awarded the Mineralogical Society of America's highest honor, the Roebling Medal. Schreyer was a leading expert on phase relations in the MgO–Al2O3–SiO2–H2O (MASH) system, specializing in cordierite and minerals with equivalent chemical compositions, and high pressure and ultra high-pressure metamorphic mineral assemblages.

The mineral Schreyerite (V2Ti3O9) was named after Schreyer.

References

20th-century German geologists
German mineralogists
Academic staff of Ruhr University Bochum
1930 births
2006 deaths